The fifth season of the American situational comedy Workaholics premiered on Comedy Central at 10/9c on January 14 and concluded on April 8, 2015 with a total of 13 episodes.

Cast

Main

Starring
Blake Anderson as Blake Henderson
Adam DeVine as Adam DeMamp
Anders Holm as Anders "Ders" Holmvik

Also starring
Jillian Bell as Jillian Belk
Erik Griffin as Montez Walker
Maribeth Monroe as Alice Murphy

Recurring
Kyle Newacheck as Karl Hevachek
Bill Stevenson as Bill

Guest
Alessandra Torresani as Crystal
Crista Flanagan as Professor
Matthew Lawrence as Lance
Ben Stiller as Del Jacobson
Michael Urie as Joey
Jerry O'Connell as Teddy
Jack Black as Pritchard
Amy Yasbeck as Annette
Steve Howey as Blue Knight DeMamp
Dolph Lundgren as himself
Valerie Mahaffey as Celeste
Curtis Armstrong as Richard Ottmar
Tom Arnold as George
Mark McGrath as Mark McGrath

Production
Comedy Central renewed the series for a 13-episode fourth and fifth season on January 6, 2013.

Episodes

Notes

References

External links
 
 

2015 American television seasons